Cornel Alexandru Ene (born 21 July 1993) is a Romanian professional footballer who plays as a defender for Liga I club FC Hermannstadt.

Honours
CFR Cluj
Cupa României: 2015–16
Supercupa României runner-up: 2016

References

External links
 
 

1993 births
Living people
Sportspeople from Satu Mare
Romanian footballers
Romania youth international footballers
Association football defenders
Liga I players
Liga II players
CFR Cluj players
FC UTA Arad players
FC Olimpia Satu Mare players
CS Pandurii Târgu Jiu players
ASA 2013 Târgu Mureș players
ASC Daco-Getica București players
Kisvárda FC players
Gyirmót FC Győr players
CS Mioveni players
FC Hermannstadt players
Nemzeti Bajnokság I players
Romanian expatriate footballers
Expatriate footballers in Hungary
Romanian expatriate sportspeople in Hungary